Tales from the Expat Harem: Foreign Women in Modern Turkey is a nonfiction anthology by 32 expatriate women about their lives in modern Turkey, published by Seal Press in North America (2006) and Doğan Kitap in Turkey (2005,  Turkish edition,  English edition).

Edited by Anastasia M. Ashman and Jennifer Eaton Gökmen, two American writers based in Istanbul, it was an English language #1 national bestseller in Turkey in January 2006. Its Turkish edition, Türkçe Sevmek: Türkiye'de Yaşayan Yabancı Kadınların Gözüyle Türkler, contains a foreword written by the Turkish novelist Elif Shafak.

In May 2008, the book and its editors were featured on NBC's Today, on its occasional travel segment Where in the World is Matt Lauer?

Contributing writers

References

2006 non-fiction books
2006 anthologies
Turkish autobiographies
Essay anthologies
Travel books
Autobiographies
Anthropology books
Harem
Ethnographic literature
Sociology books
Gender studies books
Feminist books
Arts in Turkey
Society of Turkey
Tourism in Turkey
Culture in Istanbul
Books about Turkey